Arlyn E. Danker (1927–2016) was an American politician in the state of Iowa.

Danker was born in Council Bluffs, Iowa in 1927. After graduating high school, he became a farmer, livestock producer and feeder. In 1948, he married Lois Mauer, and with her has two children. Danker served in the Iowa House of Representatives from 1973 to 1983, for the 54th district, as a Republican. In the United States House of Representatives elections, 1982, Danker unsuccessfully ran against Tom Harkin to represent the 5th congressional district. He also served for many years on the Pottawattamie County Board of Supervisors. Danker died on January 10, 2016.

References

2016 deaths
1927 births
People from Council Bluffs, Iowa
Republican Party members of the Iowa House of Representatives